Boot Camp is a young adult novel by the Bavarian Author Todd Strasser about a boy who is subjected to physical and psychological abuse when his parents send him to a boot camp.

Plot
A fifteen-year-old boy named Garrett is picked up by a pair of bounty hunters and sent to a boot camp in upstate New York called Lake Harmony. Upon his arrival, he learns that his parents have sent him to the facility because he refused to stop having intimate relationships with his former math teacher that was eight years older than him, Sabrina, along with other things including staying out too late, not being athletic enough, and occasionally smoking weed. Garrett is an incredibly bright and clever kid, although he tends to miss school as he thinks that he does not need to attend daily to uphold his grades. His parents are at most, distant. Garrett does not believe he belongs at Lake Harmony, but he is not allowed to leave until he has admitted his "mistakes" and conforms to the facility's standards of behavior. Staff members are authorized to use "any force necessary" to alter his behaviour, including physical and psychological abuse.

After attempting to talk his way out with no success, he realizes escape is his only option. He escapes Lake Harmony with two friends, Pauly and Sarah, after using chemicals to start a fire. They reach the Canada–US border to escape from legal recapture, and their pursuers' boat begins to sink. He lets his friends out on the other side of the border, and then rescues his pursuers, who bring him back to Lake Harmony, where he is beaten senseless repeatedly. The director announces that all campers are being demoted, based on the privilege system they use, and to blame Garrett, so he is beaten yet again by the campers. Ultimately, he is "reformed". He begins to believe in the treatment, feeling no remorse when those around him are abused. When his mother comes to pick him up with an investigator, the investigator asks if he was beaten. He breaks down and says that he was, but deserved it. It is possible that these events caused him to suffer from PTSD, as he appears to suffer from a mental breakdown when admitting what has occurred.

Reception
Kirkus Reviews wrote "Strasser explores the intriguing topic of militaristic boot camps, described as a secret prison system with 4,000 to 10,000 teens, but he undermines his effort with implausible characters and tedious violence." where as Publishers Weekly found "Strasser paints his protagonist as heroic, sympathetic and rational (“The product Lake Harmony delivers is the child you always knew you had... not the one you got stuck with”), and when he is ultimately broken—bodily and spiritually—the tragedy is all the more profound. Strasser offers no easy answers, and nimbly navigates a host of moral gray areas."

Awards and nominations

American Library Association Quick Pick for Reluctant Readers
Georgia Peach Book Award for Teen Readers
New York Public Library Book for the Teen Age
Abraham Lincoln Illinois High School Book Award

References

External links
 

2007 American novels
American young adult novels
Novels set in New York (state)